Daniel Jarlath Carey (2 June 1932 – 4 October 2006) was a Northern Irish sportsperson.  He played Gaelic football with his local club Dundrum and was a member of the Down senior inter-county team from the 1950s until the 1960s.  Carey won back-to-back All-Ireland titles with Down in 1960 and 1961. He later served as a Social Democratic and Labour Party councillor on Down District Council from 1977 to 1981.

Honours
Down
 Ulster Senior Football Championship (5): 1959 1960 1961 1963 1965
 All-Ireland Senior Football Championship (2): 1960 1961
 National Football League (2): 1960 1963
 Dr Lagan Cup (5): 1960 1961 1962 1963 1964
 Dr McKenna Cup (3): 1959 1961 1964
Ballymartin
 Down Senior Football Championship (1): 1955

References

1932 births
2006 deaths
Dundrum Gaelic footballers
Down inter-county Gaelic footballers
Ulster inter-provincial Gaelic footballers